is a special ward located in Tokyo Metropolis, Japan. The English translation of its Japanese self-designation is Sumida City.

As of May 1, 2015, the ward has an estimated population of 257,300, and a population density of 18,690 persons per km2. The total area is 13.77 km2.

Its City Office is located in Azumabashi, but its commercial centre is the area around Kinshicho Station in the south.

Geography
Sumida is in the north-eastern part of the mainland portion of Tokyo. The Sumida and Arakawa are the major rivers, and form parts of its boundaries. Its neighbors are all special wards: Adachi to the north; Arakawa to the northwest; Katsushika to the east; Edogawa to the southeast; Taitō to the west; Chūō to the southwest; and Kōtō to the south.

Landmarks

Tokyo Skytree: A digital terrestrial television broadcasting tower used by NHK and other broadcasters. It is the tallest tower in the world and the tallest man-made structure in Japan. The commercial facility Sky Tree Town "Solamachi" is adjacent to the premises of Tokyo Sky Tree, and Sumida Aquarium is located on the 5th and 6th floors.
Ryōgoku Kokugikan (National Sumo Stadium)
Edo-Tokyo Museum
Asahi Breweries Headquarters: The Asahi Beer Hall with the Asahi flame created by French designer Philippe Starck in 1989, is one of Tokyo's most recognizable modern structures.
Eko-in: Buddhist temple
Honjo Matsuzaka-cho Park: the residence of Kira Yoshinaka stood on this site. The Forty-seven rōnin took his life during the Genroku era.
Hokusai-dori (street), with a series of prints by famed Japanese artist Hokusai who was born in the Kamezawa area of Sumida.
Kinshicho Station, among the most popular places to play the mobile game Pokémon GO in the entire of Japan. It's easy to see people staring at their phones for hours and catching every single Pokémon around the area.
Sumida Triphony Hall, concert hall
Tobu Museum
Tokyo Irei-do (Tokyo Memorial Hall): a memorial to those unidentified people who died in the Great Kantō earthquake, the Bombing of Tokyo in World War II and other catastrophes; by Itō Chūta
 Yokoamicho Park, in the Yokoami district

Places

In the north (the former Mukojima Ward): Sumida, Tsutsumi-dori, Higashi Sumida, Yahiro, Mukojima, Higashi Mukojima, Tachibana, Bunka, Kyojima, Oshiage
In the center (former Honjo Ward): Azuma-bashi, Higashi Komagata, Honjo, Narihira, Yokokawa
In the south (former Honjo Ward): Yokoami, Ryogoku, Chitose, Ishiwara, Kamezawa, Midori, Tatekawa, Kikukawa, Taihei, Kinshi, Koto-bashi

History
The ward was founded on March 15, 1947. It was previously the (ordinary) wards Honjo and Mukojima. Mukojima, formed in 1932, contained the former town of Sumida, which along with the river gave the ward its name.

Companies

Asahi Breweries has its headquarters in Azuma-bashi.
Japan Tobacco has a plant in Yokokawa.
Keisei Electric Railway has its headquarters in Oshiage.
Lion Corporation, the detergent and toiletries giant, has its home office in Honjo.
Tobu Railway has its headquarters in Oshiage.

Politics
As of 2005, the mayor is Noboru Yamazaki. The council consists of 34 members.

Transport

Rail lines
JR East Sōbu Main Line: Kinshichō, Ryōgoku Stations
Tobu Railway
Tōbu Isesaki Line: Oshiage, Tokyo Skytree, Hikifune, Higashi-Mukōjima, Kanegafuchi Stations
Tōbu Kameido Line: Higashi-Azuma, Omurai, Hikifune Stations
Keisei Electric Railway Keisei Oshiage Line: Oshiage, Keisei Hikifune, Yahiro Stations
Tokyo Metro Hanzōmon Line: Kinshichō, Oshiage Stations
Tokyo Metropolitan Bureau of Transportation
Toei Asakusa Line: Honjō Azuma-bashi, Oshiage Stations
Toei Shinjuku Line: Kikukawa Station
Toei Ōedo Line: Ryōgoku Station

Railway stations

 Higashi-Azuma Station
 Higashi-Mukōjima Station
 Hikifune Station
 Honjo-Azumabashi Station
 Kanegafuchi Station
 Kinshichō Station
 Kikukawa Station
 Tokyo Skytree Station
 Omurai Station
 Oshiage Station
 Ryōgoku Station
 Yahiro Station

Highways
Shuto Expressway
C2 Central Loop
No.6 Mukōjima Route
No.7 Komatsugawa Route
National highways
Route 6
Route 14

Notable people

Historical
Ryūnosuke Akutagawa lived in Mukojima
Enomoto Takeaki lived in Mukojima
Katsushika Hokusai was born in Kamezawa
Katsu Kaishū was born in Kamezawa
Kōda Rohan lived in Mukōjima
Matsuo Bashō lived in Honjō
Mori Ōgai lived in Mukōjima
Nezumi Kozō (Jirokichi): a memorial is located at Eko-in

Modern
Haruka Igawa: actress, model
Chosuke Ikariya: actor, comedian (The Drifters)
Nana Kinomi: actress
Masakazu Morita, voice actor
Masao Oba: former WBA flyweight champion
Sadaharu Oh: baseball player and manager
Kazuhito Tadano: Major League Baseball player
Suihō Tagawa: manga artist
Hisanori Takahashi: baseball player
Tomomi Takano: model and professional boxer 
Yoshihiro Takayama: pro wrestler
Chisa Yokoyama: voice actor
Shunsuke Kazama, actor, voice actor and tarento

Education
Metropolitan high schools are operated by the Tokyo Metropolitan Government Board of Education.

 
 Mukojima Commercial High School
 Mukojima Technical High School
 
 
 
 

In addition, the metropolitan school district also operates a metropolitan junior high school:
 

Municipal kindergartens, elementary schools, and junior high schools are operated by Sumida City Board of Education (墨田区教育委員会).

Municipal junior high schools:

 Azumadaini ("Azuma No. 2") Junior High School (吾嬬第二中学校)
 Azumamatchibana Junior High School (吾嬬立花中学校)
 Bunka Junior High School (文花中学校)
 Honjyo Junior High School (本所中学校)
 Kinshi Junior High School (錦糸中学校)
 Ryogoku Junior High School (両国中学校)
 Sakuratsutsumi Junior High School (桜堤中学校)
 Sumida Junior High School (墨田中学校)
 Tatekawa Junior High School (竪川中学校)
 Terashima Junior High School (寺島中学校)

Municipal elementary schools:

 No. 1 Terajima (第一寺島小学校)
 No. 2 Terajima (第二寺島小学校)
 No. 3 Azuma (第三吾嬬小学校)
 No. 3 Terajima (第三寺島小学校)
 No. 4 Azuma (第四吾嬬小学校)
 Chuwa (中和小学校)
 Futaba (二葉小学校)
 Higashiazuma (東吾嬬小学校)
 Hikifune (曳舟小学校)
 Kikukawa (菊川小学校)
 Kinshi (錦糸小学校)
 Kototoi (言問小学校)
 Koume (小梅小学校)
 Midori (緑小学校)
 Nakagawa (中川小学校)
 Narihira (業平小学校)
 Oshiage (押上小学校)
 Ryogoku (両国小学校)
 Sotode (外手小学校)
 Sumida (隅田小学校)
 Tachibana Azuma-no-Mori (立花吾嬬の森小学校)
 Umekawa (梅若小学校)
 Yahiro (八広小学校)
 Yanagashima (柳島小学校)
 Yokokawa (横川小学校)

Municipal kindergartens:

 Daisanterajima ("No. 3 Terajima") (第三寺島幼稚園)
 Hikifune (曳舟幼稚園)
 Kikukawa (菊川幼稚園)
 Midori (緑幼稚園)
 Tachibana (立花幼稚園)
 Yahiro (八広幼稚園)
 Yanagishima (柳島幼稚園)

International schools:
  - North Korean school

International relations
Sumida maintains sister-city relationships with Seodaemun-gu, Seoul, South Korea, and with Shijingshan District, Beijing, China.

Works set in Sumida
 Chushingura, the fictional account of the events surrounding the revenge of the Forty-seven Ronin
 Bokuto Kitan, the novel by Nagai Kafu
 You're Under Arrest manga series
 Battle Kuma Oni. in Kachidoki Bridge 「東京激震! 新生莫斯科華撃団! Tōkyō Gekishin! Shinsei Mosukuba Kagekidan!」 Tokyo Trembles! The New Moscow Combat Revue! in Oji Hiroi's 2000 Sakura Wars TV Series Shin Sakura Taisen the Animation 2020.

References

External links

 Sumida City Official Website 

 
Wards of Tokyo